József Pálinkás (born 18 September 1952) is a Hungarian atomic physicist and politician who served as Minister of Education between 2001 and 2002. He was President of the Hungarian Academy of Sciences from 2008 to 2014.

Thereafter Pálinkás functioned as Government Commissioner responsible for the creation of the National Research, Development and Innovation Office (NKFIH) from 12 June to 31 December 2014. Following that he was President of the National Research, Development and Innovation Office between 1 January 2015 and 30 June 2018.

Publications
Experimental Investigation of the Angular Distribution of Characteristic X-Radiation Following Electron Impact Ionisation (co-author, 1979)
L3-Subshell Alignment in Gold Following Low-Velocity Proton and He+ Impact Ionisation (co-author, 1980)
L3-Subshell Alignment of Gold by C+ and N+ Impact Ionisation (co-author, 1982)
Alignment of He- and H-Like P-States of 48-MeV Foil-Excited Mg Ions (co-author, 1985)
Observation of the Electron Capture into the Continuum States of Neutral Projectiles (co-author, 1989)
Egzotikus elektronbefogási folyamatok (1996)
Status of CMS and B-physics with CMS (co-author, 2000)
The CMS Experiment at the CERN LHC (co-author, 2008)

External links
Scientific publications of József Pálinkás on INSPIRE-HEP

References
 Adatlap a Magyar Tudományos Akadémia honlapján, publikációs listával
 Életrajz a Fidesz – Magyar Polgári Szövetség honlapján

1952 births
Living people
Education ministers of Hungary
Members of the Hungarian Academy of Sciences
People associated with CERN
People from Borsod-Abaúj-Zemplén County
Members of the National Assembly of Hungary (2006–2010)